is a Japanese footballer who plays as a forward for German club FV Illertissen.

Career

FC Memmingen
Watanabe joined FC Memmingen in Germany on 1 January 2019.

References

External links
 Profile on FuPa.net
 

1995 births
Living people
Association football people from Tokyo
Japanese expatriate footballers
Japanese expatriate sportspeople in Germany
Expatriate footballers in Germany
Keio University alumni
Japanese footballers
Association football forwards
VfR Aalen players
FC Memmingen players
FV Illertissen players
3. Liga players
Regionalliga players